913 Otila (prov. designation:  or ) is a bright Flora asteroid from the inner regions of the asteroid belt. It was discovered by German astronomer Karl Reinmuth at the Heidelberg Observatory on 19 May 1919. It was named after a common German female name unrelated to the discoverer's contemporaries, that was taken from the almanac Lahrer Hinkender Bote.

Orbit and classification 

When applying the synthetic hierarchical clustering method (HCM) by Nesvorný, or the 1995 HCM-analysis by Zappalà, Otila is a member of the Flora family, a giant asteroid family and the largest family of stony asteroids in the main-belt. However, according to another HCM-analysis by Milani and Knežević (AstDys), it is a background asteroid as this analysis does not recognize the Flora asteroid clan. Otila orbits the Sun in the inner main-belt at a distance of 1.8–2.6 AU once every 3 years and 3 months (1,190 days; semi-major axis of 2.2 AU). Its orbit has an eccentricity of 0.17 and an inclination of 6° with respect to the ecliptic.

Naming 

This minor planet was named "Otila", after a female name picked from the Lahrer Hinkender Bote, published in Lahr, southern Germany. A Hinkender Bote (lit. "limping messenger") was a very popular almanac, especially in the alemannic-speaking region from the late 17th throughout the early 20th century. The calendar section contains feast days, the dates of important fairs and astronomical ephemerides. For 26 February, the calendar gives "Otila" as the German name day analogue next to Hestor and Alexander, the protestant and catholic entries in the calendar of saints, latter likely referring to Pope Alexander I of Alexandria, whose feast day is also 26 February.

Reinmuth's calendar names 

Otila is the first in a series of 23 asteroids – ending with 1144 Oda – for which Reinmuth used the Lahrer Hinkender Bote to select names from, as he had trouble thinking of proper names due to his many asteroid discoveries. These names are not related to the discoverer's contemporaries. Lutz Schmadel, the author of the Dictionary of Minor Planet Names learned about Reinmuth's source of inspiration from private communications with Dutch astronomer Ingrid van Houten-Groeneveld, who worked as a young astronomer at Heidelberg.

Physical characteristics 

In the Bus–Binzel SMASS classification, Otila is an Sa-subtype that transitions from a common, stony S-type to an uncommon A-type asteroid, while in the Bus-DeMeo-taxonomy, it is an Sw-type asteroid, where the "w" notation is used for a objects with a high spectral slope (greater than 0.25).

Rotation period 

In April 2007, a rotational lightcurve of Otila was obtained from photometric observations by Julian Oey. Lightcurve analysis gave a rotation period of  hours with a brightness amplitude of  magnitude.

Diameter and albedo 

The Collaborative Asteroid Lightcurve Link assumes a standard albedo for members of the Flora family of 0.24 and calculates a diameter of 10.80 kilometers based on an absolute magnitude of 12.0.

References

External links 
 Do Slivan states exist in the Flora family?. I. Photometric survey of the Flora region, Astronomy & Astrophysics, A. Kryszczynska
 Lightcurve Database Query (LCDB), at www.minorplanet.info
 Dictionary of Minor Planet Names, Google books
 Discovery Circumstances: Numbered Minor Planets (1)-(5000) – Minor Planet Center
 
 

000913
Discoveries by Karl Wilhelm Reinmuth
Named minor planets
000913
19190519